Coleophora jynxella is a moth of the family Coleophoridae. It is found in southern France and Spain.

References

jynxella
Moths described in 1987
Moths of Europe